South Carolina v. Gathers, 490 U.S. 805 (1989), was a United States Supreme Court case which held that testimony in the form of a victim impact statement is admissible during the sentencing phase of a trial only if it directly relates to the "circumstances of the crime." This case was later overruled by the Supreme Court decision in Payne v. Tennessee.

Decision
In a majority opinion by Justice Brennan, the Court held that Booth v. Maryland (1987) left open the possibility that the kind of information contained in victim impact statements could be admissible if it "relate[d] directly to the circumstances of the crime." Though South Carolina asserted that such was the case, the Court disagreed, and held that the content of the cards at issue was irrelevant to the "circumstances of the crime."

Justice O'Connor authored a dissenting opinion, joined by Chief Justice Rehnquist and Justice Kennedy. Justice Scalia also dissented and expressly argued that Booth v. Maryland should be overruled.

Aftermath
The impact of the case was somewhat short-lived, as two years later, the Rehnquist Court decided Payne, which has had a significant impact in victim's rights, criminology, and the lives of the parties involved.

See also
Crime in the United States
Criminology
Crime victim advocacy program
List of United States Supreme Court cases, volume 490
List of United States Supreme Court cases
Lists of United States Supreme Court cases by volume
List of United States Supreme Court cases by the Rehnquist Court
Victimology
Victim Support
Victim study

References

External links
 
Discussion of the death penalty

United States Supreme Court cases
United States Supreme Court cases of the Rehnquist Court
1989 in United States case law
Cruel and Unusual Punishment Clause and death penalty case law
Victimology
Capital punishment in South Carolina